Partial general elections were held in Belgium on 11 June 1850. In the Chamber of Representatives elections the result was a victory for the Liberal Party, who won 69 of the 108 seats. Voter turnout was 69.1%, although only 40,435 people were eligible to vote.

Under the alternating system, elections were only held in five out of the nine provinces: Antwerp, Brabant, Luxembourg, Namur and West Flanders.

Results

Chamber of Representatives

References

1850s elections in Belgium
General
Belgium
Belgium